Requeijão is a milk-derived product, produced in Portugal and Brazil. It is a loose, ricotta-like cheese used to make cheese spreads. It can be a good substitute to mild, unsalty ricotta. This variety is sometimes sold in the markets wrapped in fresh corn husks. In El Salvador, cheeses such as requesón can sometimes be transported wrapped in banana leaves instead.

The Portuguese product is white to yellowish-white, solid, and usually having a characteristic strong taste; typically sold in specially designed draining plastic or basket-like weaved containers, or in plastic cups.

The Brazilian product is a type of cream cheese white in color (but not similar to the American notion of cream cheese, and may be better understood as "cheese cream"). It has a mild taste and its consistency can vary from creamy solid, like the Catupiry, to liquid. Traditionally associated with the state of Minas Gerais, the mineiro presence in Rio de Janeiro and São Paulo from the start of the 20th century on popularized it and nowadays it is produced all over the country. Its most common variant is requeijão cremoso, with a consistency similar to that of condensed milk; usually sold in glass or plastic cups, both generally re-employed by Brazilians as regular cups.

Romeu-e-Julieta is a dessert that combines white cheese and guava paste. It usually calls for queijo minas, requeijão or ricotta, with requeijão generally being the one used in Brazilian-adapted pizzas, crêpes, waffles, pancake rolls and spring rolls.

Manufacturing 

Skim milk is held until lactic acid bacteria acidify and coagulate its proteins. The curdled milk is stirred and heated to a temperature as high as 80 °C (175 °F), then the whey is drained off and the curd is gathered in bags and pressed. The curd is placed in flat pans, broken up, and washed with warm skim milk, to form a mixture consisting of two parts milk to one part curd. This mixture is stirred and heated, as before, until the casein in the milk curdles and adheres to the mass of curd. The steps of draining, pressing, adding more skim milk, and heating are repeated once more. The curd is drained again, salted (2 to 2.5% by weight) and kneaded on a table for about 15 minutes. Hot milkfat or dairy cream is added, about one part of butterfat for every five parts of curd, and the mixture is once again heated and stirred. The cheese is then molded in parchment-lined boxes.

About 11 kg of cheese is obtained from 100 kg of skim milk and 3.4 kg of cream. Composition varies, but a typical cheese can contain 55–70% water, 8–20% fat, and 16–20.5% protein.

Requeijão da Serra da Estrela
The requeijão made in  the Serra da Estrela region of Portugal, Requeijão da Serra da Estrela is a Protected Designation of Origin (PDO/DOP) since 2005 in the EU and the UK.

See also
Catupiry
List of Brazilian dishes
 List of cheeses
Portuguese cuisine
List of Portugal food and drink products with protected status

References 
 
Text in this article was incorporated from the following public domain U.S. Government publication: 
 Doane, C.F.; Hargrove, Robert C.; Lawson, H.W.; Matheson, K.J.; Sanders, G.P; Walter, Homer E. (1969). Cheese Varieties and Descriptions. U.S. Department of Agriculture. p. 105

Cow's-milk cheeses
Mixed-milk cheeses
Brazilian cheeses
Portuguese cheeses
Portuguese products with protected designation of origin